Jennifer Vegi is a female taekwondo practitioner from Wallis and Futuna. She won the gold medal in the women's 67 kg taekwondo event at the 2007 Pacific Games.

References

Living people
Wallis and Futuna female taekwondo practitioners
Year of birth missing (living people)